Macrocalyx is a taxonomic plant genus synonym that may refer to:

Macrocalyx  = Megistostegium
Macrocalyx  = Psychotria

References